Kirit Somaiya (born 12 February 1954) is an Indian politician of the Bharatiya Janata Party who represented Mumbai North-East in the 16th Lok Sabha and the 13th Lok Sabha. He is currently appointed as vice president of Bharatiya Janata Party's Maharashtra unit.

Early life and education
Somaiya was born and brought up in Mumbai in a middle-class family. He graduated as Chartered accountant from the Institute of Chartered Accountants of India] (ICAI) in 1979 and also secured a rank in the All India Merit List. He was conferred with a Doctorate from the University of Mumbai in 2005, with thesis of "Capital Market: Small Investors Protection". He is credited with submitting one of the longest thesis of 1,202 pages which was submitted in 2 volumes.

He married Medha Somaiya and they have one son. His son, Neil, also joined BJP and he is Municipal Councillor from Ward 108 Mulund.

Political career
As a student activist, Somaiya took part in the Jayprakash Narayan's Bihar Movement in 1975 when a state of national emergency was declared in country. Later on, he joined the BJP and represented the Mulund Vidhan Sabha Constituency of Maharashtra Legislative Assembly and the Mumbai North-East Lok Sabha Constituency.

In 1995, Somaiya contested the Maharashtra Assembly elections and got elected from the Mulund assembly where he won by a margin of 43,527 votes. As a M.L.A., he got 2 major Acts passed in the Maharashtra Assembly - Small Investors’ Protection Act of Maharashtra, Repealing Coroners Court (Post Mortem) Act and introduced the Housing Society Conveyance Bill.

In 1999 Lok Sabha election, Somaiya defeated the incumbent Gurudas Kamat of the Indian National Congress by a margin of 7,276 votes. As a parliamentarian, he submitted the maximum number of petitions to the parliament, i.e. 11 (out of 27 total petitions presented in 13th Lok Sabha) during his tenure in Lok Sabha which was the highest number of petitions submitted by any MP in the history of Indian Parliament. He was an active member of the house where during his tenure he raised a total of 832 questions in the house on several issues.

On 27 February 2014, the BJP announced its first list of candidates for the 2014 Lok Sabha Elections and Somaiya was fielded as the BJP candidate from Mumbai North East. He defeated the incumbent Sanjay Dina Patil of the Sharad Pawar led Nationalist Congress Party by a large margin of 317,122 votes.

Positions held

 Member of Parliament , Lok Sabha 
 National Secretary – BJP
 MLA - Maharashtra Legislative Assembly
 Vice President – Maharashtra BJP
 President – Mumbai BJP
 All India Convenor - BJP Investors Cell
 President – Bharatiya Janata Yuva Morcha , Maharashtra

Social and political contributions
As the National convener of the Anti-Corruption – Scam Expose Committee of the BJP, Somaiya ran a Nationwide campaign against corruption of the ruling UPA Government and its allies where he travelled through 16 states and 100 districts exposing several scams. He has, however, been characteristically silent on scams and corruption within his own party like the Yeddyurappa scandal.

Often, Somaiya in his exposes has taken on several Ministers and Senior Politicians for charges of corruption and also filed Public Interest Litigations (PIL) in an attempt to bring justice.

Some of the scams Somaiya has exposed /pursued include the NSEL case, Coal mining scam, Maharashtra Sadan Scam, Adarsh Scam, Wheat Scam, DMAT scam, and Maharashtra Irrigation Scam.

As a People's Activist, Somaiya has made several contributions, both Social and political in nature. He founded the NGO "Yuvak Pratishthan" which has been active for over 3 decades in taking up several initiatives such as Slum Rehabilitation, Cheap and Accessible Healthcare for all, Promotion of Education and Sports.

Some of his Notable Social Contributions:
 Hepatitis B Free Mumbai where more than 32 Lakhs vaccines were provided at a subsidized rate (Setting a record in Limca Book of Records)
 ‘Cataract Free Mumbai’ Campaign where over 400 camps were held all over Mumbai
 Rail Pravasi Suraksha Abhiyaan – Submitted a petition to the Parliament which was co-signed by 50,000 railway passengers of Mumbai to address the safety issues at Mumbai's railway stations
 founded the Investors’ Grievances Forum (IGF) in 1994, an NGO with a social objective dedicated to the protection and safeguarding of the rights of investors through education, awareness, guidance, mass campaigns and representations to regulators, government authorities and courts.

References

External links

 
 Biographical Sketch: Member of Parliament: 13th Lok Sabha

1954 births
Living people
Bharatiya Janata Party politicians from Maharashtra
India MPs 1999–2004
Lok Sabha members from Maharashtra
India MPs 2014–2019